Harold Sigvald "Hod" Ofstie (May 5, 1891 – June 17, 1961) was an American college football player and coach. He served as the head football coach at Ripon College in Ripon, Wisconsin from 1915 to 1916 and at Centre College in Danville, Kentucky from 1926 to 1927.

Ofstie served as a lieutenant in the United States Army during World War I. He died on June 17, 1961.

Head coaching record

Football

References

External links
 Sports Reference profile
 

1891 births
1961 deaths
American football ends
Centre Colonels football coaches
Centre Colonels men's basketball coaches
Great Lakes Navy Bluejackets football coaches
Mississippi State Bulldogs football coaches
Ripon Red Hawks football coaches
Ripon Red Hawks men's basketball coaches
USC Trojans football coaches
Wisconsin Badgers football coaches
Wisconsin Badgers football players
College track and field coaches in the United States
United States Army personnel of World War I
United States Army officers
People from Appleton, Minnesota
Military personnel from Minnesota